Every Time I Breathe is the fourth album by the Mobile, Alabama based CCM/Christian rock band, Big Daddy Weave. It was released on September 26, 2006.  This album charted on the following Billboard's charts on October 14, 2006:  No. 18 on Christian Albums, and No. 10 on Top Heatseekers.

Track listing

Personnel 

Big Daddy Weave
 Mike Weaver – lead and backing vocals, acoustic guitars, arrangements (11)
 Jeremy Redmon – electric guitars, backing vocals 
 Joe Shirk – keyboards, saxophone 
 Jay Weaver – bass, backing vocals 
 Jeff Jones – drums

Additional Musicians
 Matt Gilder – keyboards
 Jonathan Chu – violin (2, 5)
 PureNRG – kids choir (5)

Production 
 Jeremy Redmon – producer, tracking engineer, overdub engineer 
 Big Daddy Weave – producers
 Josh Bailey – executive producer 
 Susan Riley – executive producer
 David Wallace Cox – tracking engineer
 Chuck Harris – tracking engineer
 Tim Hochstedler – assistant tracking engineer 
 Shane D. Wilson – mixing 
 Alice Smith – mix coordinator 
 Andrew Mendelson – mastering 
 Katherine Petillo – creative director 
 Gary Dorsey – design, photography 
 Kaysie Dorsey – design, photography

Radio singles
 "Let It Rise"
 "Every Time I Breathe"

Bonus features
The CD was released as an enhanced CD, which includes:
 Lyrics to the songs on the album as MediaShout files.
 Every Time I Breathe Music Video
 B-roll footage of the band on the road
 Chord charts

Music videos
 Every Time I Breathe (July 26, 2006)

References

External links
Official album page

2006 albums
Big Daddy Weave albums
Fervent Records albums